Nayely Nahomi Bolaños Vera (born 25 February 2003) is an Ecuadorian footballer who plays as a forward for Cuenca and the Ecuador women's national team.

Biography
Bolaños learned to play football at the age of 10, participating in youth male football schools that were in her native Ventanas since she showed great conditions in the game. On countless occasions she had difficulties in these schools because the boys resisted a woman playing with them. This only made Bolaños take more courage to fight and win a place on the pitch. In 2016, at the age of 13 years, she debuted with the Club 7 de Febrero where she stayed for 3 years. At the beginning of 2019, María José Benítez, who is the coordinator of the El Nacional, spoke with Bolaños' parents so that she can be part of the Puras Criollas and thus play the nascent Superliga Femenina.

Club career

Club 7 de Febrero
Bolaños started playing at Club 7 de Febrero of Ventanas, where she played until 2018.

El Nacional
In 2019, Bolaños signed for El Nacional, since then she has been the undisputed starter, scoring goals in important matches and being a figure in these matches, she also helped her team to be crowned champion of Superliga Femenina in 2020. Likewise, she was part of the women's national under-16, to compete in Torneo Evolución, which was organized by CONMEBOL in the city of Asunción.

Honours

Club
 El Nacional
 Superliga Femenina: 2020
 Cuenca
 Superliga Femenina: 2021

References

2003 births
Living people
Women's association football forwards
Ecuadorian women's footballers
People from Ventanas
Ecuador women's international footballers
C.D. El Nacional Femenino players
21st-century Ecuadorian women